Jean-Pascal Curtillet (21 September 1942 – 6 March 2000) was a French freestyle swimmer who competed in the 1960 Summer Olympics and in the 1964 Summer Olympics. He was born in Algiers, French Algeria.

References

1942 births
2000 deaths
Sportspeople from Algiers
Pieds-Noirs
French male freestyle swimmers
Olympic swimmers of France
Swimmers at the 1960 Summer Olympics
Swimmers at the 1964 Summer Olympics
European Aquatics Championships medalists in swimming
Mediterranean Games gold medalists for France
Swimmers at the 1963 Mediterranean Games
Mediterranean Games medalists in swimming
20th-century French people